In physics, a partition function describes the statistical properties of a system in thermodynamic equilibrium.  Partition functions are functions of the thermodynamic state variables,  such as the temperature and volume. Most of the aggregate thermodynamic variables of the system, such as the total energy, free energy, entropy, and pressure, can be expressed in terms of the partition function or its derivatives. The partition function is dimensionless.

Each partition function is constructed to represent a particular statistical ensemble (which, in turn, corresponds to a particular free energy). The most common statistical ensembles have named partition functions. The canonical partition function applies to a canonical ensemble, in which the system is allowed to exchange heat with the environment at fixed temperature, volume, and number of particles. The grand canonical partition function applies to a grand canonical ensemble, in which the system can exchange both heat and particles with the environment, at fixed temperature, volume, and chemical potential. Other types of partition functions can be defined for different circumstances; see partition function (mathematics) for generalizations. The partition function has many physical meanings, as discussed in Meaning and significance.

Canonical partition function

Definition 
Initially, let us assume that a thermodynamically large system is in thermal contact with the environment, with a temperature T, and both the volume of the system and the number of constituent particles are fixed. A collection of this kind of system comprises an ensemble called a canonical ensemble. The appropriate mathematical expression for the canonical partition function depends on the degrees of freedom of the system, whether the context is classical mechanics or quantum mechanics, and whether the spectrum of states is discrete or continuous.

Classical discrete system

For a canonical ensemble that is classical and discrete, the canonical partition function is defined as

where
  is the index for the microstates of the system;
  is Euler's number;
  is the thermodynamic beta, defined as  where  is Boltzmann's constant;
  is the total energy of the system in the respective microstate.

The exponential factor  is otherwise known as the Boltzmann factor.

Classical continuous system

In classical mechanics, the position and momentum variables of a particle can vary continuously, so the set of microstates is actually uncountable. In classical statistical mechanics, it is rather inaccurate to express the partition function as a sum of discrete terms. In this case we must describe the partition function using an integral rather than a sum. For a canonical ensemble that is classical and continuous, the canonical partition function is defined as

where
  is the Planck constant;
  is the Hamiltonian of the system;
  is the canonical position;
  is the canonical momentum.

To make it into a dimensionless quantity, we must divide it by h, which is some quantity with units of action (usually taken to be Planck's constant).

Classical continuous system (multiple identical particles)

For a gas of  identical classical particles in three dimensions, the partition function is

where
  is the Planck constant;
  is the index for the particles of the system;
  is the Hamiltonian of a respective particle;
  is the canonical position of the respective particle;
  is the canonical momentum of the respective particle;

The reason for the factorial factor N! is discussed below. The extra constant factor introduced in the denominator was introduced because, unlike the discrete form, the continuous form shown above is not dimensionless. As stated in the previous section, to make it into a dimensionless quantity, we must divide it by h3N (where h is usually taken to be Planck's constant).

Quantum mechanical discrete system

For a canonical ensemble that is quantum mechanical and discrete, the canonical partition function is defined as the trace of the Boltzmann factor:

where:
  is the trace of a matrix;
  is the Hamiltonian operator.

Quantum mechanical continuous system

For a canonical ensemble that is quantum mechanical and continuous, the canonical partition function is defined as

where:
  is the Planck constant;
  is the Hamiltonian operator;
  is the canonical position;
  is the canonical momentum.

In systems with multiple quantum states s sharing the same energy Es, it is said that the energy levels of the system are degenerate. In the case of degenerate energy levels, we can write the partition function in terms of the contribution from energy levels (indexed by j) as follows:

where gj is the degeneracy factor, or number of quantum states s that have the same energy level defined by Ej = Es.

The above treatment applies to quantum statistical mechanics, where a physical system inside a finite-sized box will typically have a discrete set of energy eigenstates, which we can use as the states s above. In quantum mechanics, the partition function can be more formally written as a trace over the state space (which is independent of the choice of basis):

where  is the quantum Hamiltonian operator. The exponential of an operator can be defined using the exponential power series.

The classical form of Z is recovered when the trace is expressed in terms of coherent states
and when quantum-mechanical uncertainties in the position and momentum of a particle 
are regarded as negligible. Formally, using bra–ket notation, one inserts under the trace for each degree of freedom the identity:

where  is a normalised Gaussian wavepacket centered at
position x and momentum p. Thus

If  and  can be regarded as zero, the action of  reduces to multiplication by the classical Hamiltonian, and  reduces to the classical configuration integral.

Connection to probability theory 

For simplicity, we will use the discrete form of the partition function in this section. Our results will apply equally well to the continuous form.

Consider a system S embedded into a heat bath B. Let the total energy of both systems be E. Let pi denote the probability that the system S is in a particular microstate, i, with energy Ei. According to the fundamental postulate of statistical mechanics (which states that all attainable microstates of a system are equally probable), the probability pi will be inversely proportional to the number of microstates of the total closed system (S, B) in which S is in microstate i with energy Ei. Equivalently, pi will be proportional to the number of microstates of the heat bath B with energy E − Ei:

Assuming that the heat bath's internal energy is much larger than the energy of S (E ≫ Ei), we can Taylor-expand  to first order in Ei and use the thermodynamic relation , where here ,  are the entropy and temperature of the bath respectively:

Thus

Since the total probability to find the system in some microstate (the sum of all pi) must be equal to 1, we know that the constant of proportionality must be the normalization constant, and so, we can define the partition function to be this constant:

Calculating the thermodynamic total energy 

In order to demonstrate the usefulness of the partition function, let us calculate the thermodynamic value of the total energy. This is simply the expected value, or ensemble average for the energy, which is the sum of the microstate energies weighted by their probabilities:

or, equivalently,

Incidentally, one should note that if the microstate energies depend on a parameter λ in the manner

then the expected value of A is

This provides us with a method for calculating the expected values of many microscopic quantities. We add the quantity artificially to the microstate energies (or, in the language of quantum mechanics, to the Hamiltonian), calculate the new partition function and expected value, and then set λ to zero in the final expression. This is analogous to the source field method used in the path integral formulation of quantum field theory.

Relation to thermodynamic variables 

In this section, we will state the relationships between the partition function and the various thermodynamic parameters of the system. These results can be derived using the method of the previous section and the various thermodynamic relations.

As we have already seen, the thermodynamic energy is

The variance in the energy (or "energy fluctuation") is

The heat capacity is

In general, consider the extensive variable X and intensive variable Y where X and Y form a pair of conjugate variables. In ensembles where Y is fixed (and X is allowed to fluctuate), then the average value of X will be:

The sign will depend on the specific definitions of the variables X and Y. An example would be X = volume and Y = pressure. Additionally, the variance in X will be

In the special case of entropy, entropy is given by

Furthermore, the heat capacity can be expressed as

Partition functions of subsystems 

Suppose a system is subdivided into N sub-systems with negligible interaction energy, that is, we can assume the particles are essentially non-interacting. If the partition functions of the sub-systems are ζ1, ζ2, ..., ζN, then the partition function of the entire system is the product of the individual partition functions:

If the sub-systems have the same physical properties, then their partition functions are equal, ζ1 = ζ2 = ... = ζ, in which case 

However, there is a well-known exception to this rule. If the sub-systems are actually identical particles, in the quantum mechanical sense that they are impossible to distinguish even in principle, the total partition function must be divided by a N! (N factorial):

This is to ensure that we do not "over-count" the number of microstates. While this may seem like a strange requirement, it is actually necessary to preserve the existence of a thermodynamic limit for such systems. This is known as the Gibbs paradox.

Meaning and significance 

It may not be obvious why the partition function, as we have defined it above, is an important quantity. First, consider what goes into it. The partition function is a function of the temperature T and the microstate energies E1, E2, E3, etc. The microstate energies are determined by other thermodynamic variables, such as the number of particles and the volume, as well as microscopic quantities like the mass of the constituent particles. This dependence on microscopic variables is the central point of statistical mechanics. With a model of the microscopic constituents of a system, one can calculate the microstate energies, and thus the partition function, which will then allow us to calculate all the other thermodynamic properties of the system.

The partition function can be related to thermodynamic properties because it has a very important statistical meaning. The probability Ps that the system occupies microstate s is

Thus, as shown above, the partition function plays the role of a normalizing constant (note that it does not depend on s), ensuring that the probabilities sum up to one:

This is the reason for calling Z the "partition function": it encodes how the probabilities are partitioned among the different microstates, based on their individual energies. Other partition functions for different ensembles divide up the probabilities based on other macrostate variables. As an example: the partition function for the isothermal-isobaric ensemble, the generalized Boltzmann distribution, divides up probabilities based on particle number, pressure, and temperature. The energy is replaced by the characteristic potential of that ensemble, the Gibbs Free Energy. The letter Z stands for the German word Zustandssumme, "sum over states". The usefulness of the partition function stems from the fact that the macroscopic thermodynamic quantities of a system can be related to its microscopic details through the derivatives of its partition function. Finding the partition function is also equivalent to performing a Laplace transform of the density of states function from the energy domain to the β domain, and the inverse Laplace transform of the partition function reclaims the state density function of energies.

Grand canonical partition function

We can define a grand canonical partition function for a grand canonical ensemble, which describes the statistics of a constant-volume system that can exchange both heat and particles with a reservoir. The reservoir has a constant temperature T, and a chemical potential μ.

This partition function is closely related to the grand potential, by the relation

This can be contrasted to the canonical partition function above, which is related instead to the Helmholtz free energy.

It is important to note that the number of microstates in the grand canonical ensemble may be much larger than in the canonical ensemble, since here we consider not only variations in energy but also in particle number. Again, the utility of the grand canonical partition function is that it is related to the probability that the system is in state :

An important application of the grand canonical ensemble is in deriving exactly the statistics of a non-interacting many-body quantum gas (Fermi–Dirac statistics for fermions, Bose–Einstein statistics for bosons), however it is much more generally applicable than that. The grand canonical ensemble may also be used to describe classical systems, or even interacting quantum gases.

The grand partition function is sometimes written (equivalently) in terms of alternate variables as

See also
 Partition function (mathematics)
 Partition function (quantum field theory)
 Virial theorem
 Widom insertion method

References

Equations of physics